Ladislas Smid  (1 May 1915 – 24 September 1990) was a Hungarian-born  French football player who played with Attila FC and RC Lens, as well as the France national team.

External links
 Player profile at Worldfootball.net
 Profile at FFF

References

1915 births
1990 deaths
Hungarian footballers
French footballers
France international footballers
RC Lens players
Ligue 1 players
Association football midfielders
Footballers from Budapest